This is a list of captains and coaches of National Rugby League premiership winning teams, as well as its predecessors NSWRL, ARL and Super League. Ken Kearney has captained the most premierships with six, all at St. George, while Arthur Halloway has coached the most premierships with eight, four at Eastern Suburbs and four at Balmain.

Up until the late 1960s, teams often had captain-coaches who would play and coach at the same time. In this list, they are counted as both the captain and the coach.

List 
Source:

See also 

List of NRL Women's captains and coaches
List of current NRL coaches
List of VFL/AFL premiership captains and coaches

References

External links 

National Rugby League lists
NRL